Diathrausta ochreipennis is a moth in the family Crambidae. It was described by Arthur Gardiner Butler in 1886. It is found in Australia, where it has been recorded from Queensland and New South Wales. The habitat consists of sclerophyll  forests.

References

Moths described in 1886
Spilomelinae